Éva Besnyő (1910–2003) was a Dutch-Hungarian photographer who participated in the Nieuwe Fotografie (New Photography) movement.

Biography

Born in Budapest, Besnyö was brought up in a well-to-do Jewish home. In 1928, she started to study photography at József Pécsi's studio where she also served an apprenticeship.

In 1930, at the age of 20, she moved to Berlin where she first worked for advertising photographer René Ahrlé before working on photoreportages with the press photographer Peter Weller. She became part of the social and political circle of intellectuals which included György Kepes, Joris Ivens, László Moholy-Nagy, Otto Umbehr and Robert Capa. In 1931, she opened her own studio where she was successful in receiving agency work. Her well-known photograph of the Romani boy with a cello on his back stems from that period.  Threatened by the onset of National Socialism in 1932, she moved to Amsterdam with her Dutch friend John Fernhout whom she married. With the assistance of her mother in law Charley Toorop, she participated in exhibitions which led to commissions in press photography, portraits, fashion and architecture. Besnyö was a member of Nederlandsche Vereeniging voor Ambachts- en Nijverheidskunst (V.A.N.K.) the Dutch Association for Craft and Craft Art. Her solo exhibition in the Van Lier art gallery in 1933 consolidated her recognition in the Netherlands. Besnyö experienced a further breakthrough with her architectural photography only a few years later: translating the idea of functionalist "New Building" into a "New Seeing".

Unable to work during the German occupation of the Netherlands, she went into hiding. After the war she again received commissions for documentary work but became less active as she raised her two children fathered by the graphic designer Wim Brusse. In the 1970s, she was active in the Dutch feminist movement Dolle Mina, fighting for equal rights and photographing street protests.

Photographs for Dutch stamps (1947)

Exhibitions
1955: work selected for The Family of Man international touring exhibition by Edward Steichen and MoMA;
1982: N’halve eeuw werk, Amsterdams Historisch Museum. Amsterdam;
1991: Onbekende foto’s, Jewish Historical Museum. Amsterdam
1992: Photographien 1930–1989, Das Verborgene Museum. Berlin
1992:  Vintage Prints, Amsterdams Historisch Museum. Amsterdam;
2012: Retrospective, Jeu de Paume, Paris.

References

Further reading

External links
Examples of Eva Besnyö's work from the Van Lier Art Gallery

1910 births
2002 deaths
Artists from Amsterdam
Photographers from Budapest
Dutch Jews
Hungarian emigrants to the Netherlands
Dutch women photographers
Hungarian Jews
Hungarian women photographers
Hungarian photographers